The Wrocław–Poznań railway is a  Polish railway line, that connects southern Poland and Wrocław with Leszno, Poznań and further to Szczecin. The railway is part of European TEN-T route E59 from Scandinavia to Vienna, Budapest and Prague.

Opening
In 1853 a decision was made to build a railway line connecting Wrocław with Poznań. It obtained the concession for the construction Upper Silesian Railway (Oberschlesische Eisenbahn Gesellschaft), and construction started in Leszno, in three directions: to Wrocław, Poznań and Głogów. A prototype steam locomotive entered Leszno station from Rawicz on 27 September 1856, and the first regular train service started on 27 October 1856. The ceremonial opening of the line, involving city authorities and residents, took place 29 October 1856.

History
In the interwar period, Leszno station served as a border control station. On the railway the train service was limited to 2 passenger trains and express train 801/802 between Wroclaw and Gdańsk. From Poznan, two passenger trains reached Rawicz. Between Leszno and Wrocław there were 2 pairs of international passenger trains (without stopping in Lasocice, border control station in Leszno), and 3 pairs of trains to the border at Lasocice from Leszno. Here the border was on the line of today's border of Greater Poland Voivodeship and Lower Silesian Voivodeship.

Electrification
Electrification of the lines around Leszno took place in three stages:

31 May 1969: - Poznań - Puszczykowko
20 December 1969: Puszczykowko - Leszno
22 April 1970: Leszno - Wrocław

Modernisation
Since 2010 PKP PLK has led the modernisation of railway line E59 between Wrocław and Poznań. The project is co-financed by the European Union. As a result of the works, the line speed will be increased up to 160 km/h and thereby travel time on the section between Wrocław and Poznań will be 75 minutes (for the fastest trains). In addition, the stations Leszno and Poznań will be the two local traffic control centres. Completion of the work was planned for 2014, but is expected to last until 2020. Along with modernising the tracks, stations are being improved and sound barriers are being built.

Usage
The line is used by the following service(s):

See also 
 Railway lines of Poland

References

External links 

Railway lines in Poland
Railway lines opened in 1856